Australian war crimes may refer to:
 Allied war crimes during World War II
 Brereton Report, investigation into alleged Australian war crimes in Afghanistan